Ochina ptinoides is a species of beetles in the genus Ochina of the family Ptinidae.

Description
Elytra are dark brown. Pubescence forms transversal bands before middle and apex. Also head is dark brown. Antennae are serrate and composed by eleven segments. This species is associated with Ivy (hence the common name) and the larvae bore into the stems. Adults can be found from early May until August.

Distribution
This species can be found in most of Europe, in the Near East and in North Africa.

References

External links
 http://www.kerbtier.de/cgi-bin/enFSearch.cgi?Fam=Anobiidae Beetle Fauna of Germany

Ptinidae
Beetles described in 1802